Erich Auerbach (12 December 1911, Sokolov, now the Czech Republic – 11 August 1977, London) was a foremost Czech journalist photographer working for the weekly Pestrý týden and was the official photographer of the Czechoslovak government in exile during World War II. After the war, he continued working in London to become a recognised photographer of musicians and artists in general.

While in London he worked for Sunday Times, Daily Herald, The Observer or EMI Records. He is the author of well-known photographs of Leonard Bernstein, Henry Wood, Pablo Casals, Igor Stravinski or Jacqueline du Pre now owned by the Hulton Archives of Getty Images.

Collections
 Getty Images: artist and musicians photographs from after the war period.
 Czech Foreign Ministry still owns a large collection of his war photographs.
 National Portrait Gallery in London also owns several of his photographs

References

Bibliography
 Erich Auerbach: Volá Londýn London calling, Prague 2005

1911 births
1977 deaths
Czech photographers
Czech Jews
People from Sokolov
Czech exiles
Czechoslovak emigrants to the United Kingdom